Actinocrates is a monotypic snout moth genus in the subfamily Phycitinae. Its only species, Actinocrates euryniphas, is known from Fiji. Both the genus and species were first described by Edward Meyrick in 1934.

References

Phycitinae
Monotypic moth genera
Moths of Fiji